Ryabinino is a rural locality (a settlement) and the administrative center of Ryabininskoye Rural Settlement, Cherdynsky District, Perm Krai, Russia. The population was 1,661 as of 2010. There are 21 streets.

Geography 
Ryabinino is located 11 km south of Cherdyn (the district's administrative centre) by road. Seregovo is the nearest rural locality.

References 

Rural localities in Cherdynsky District